"Through the Rain" is a song by American recording artist Tanya Blount. Released as the second single from her debut album Natural Thing, it became the most successful release from the album, peaking at number 90 on the Billboard Hot 100.

Track listing
CD single

Cassette single

Maxi-single Through the Rain (The Remixes)

12" vinyl

Charts

References

Tanya Blount songs
1994 singles
1994 songs
Contemporary R&B ballads
Soul ballads
1990s ballads